Azizullah Azmi (7 April 1929  24 May 2010), also known as A. U. Azmi, was an Indian politician who served as member of the 7th Lok Sabha from Jaunpur parliamentary constituency in 1980. He was affiliated with Janata Party (S).

Biography 
He was born on 7 April 1929 to Alhaj Mohammad Nazir at Bakhra village of Azamgarh district, UP. He received his education from Darul Uloom Nadwatul Ulama and later obtained bachelor's degree in Unani Medicine and Surgery (BUMS) from Aligarh Muslim University in 1956. After obtaining his medicine degree, he established All India Unani Tibbi Conference and served its president, in addition to practicing medicine at Jaunpur, Uttar Pradesh. He was also associated with All India Muslim Majlis.

He was married to Masroor Jahan Azmi, with whom he had ten children, including two daughters and eight sons.

References 

1929 births
2013 deaths
Darul Uloom Nadwatul Ulama alumni
Aligarh Muslim University alumni
India MPs 1980–1984
Politicians from Azamgarh district
Janata Party (Secular) politicians